The Carancas impact event refers to the fall of the Carancas chondritic meteorite on September 15, 2007, near the village of Carancas in Peru, close to the Bolivian border and Lake Titicaca. The impact created a small crater in the clay soil and scorched earth around its location. A local official, Marco Limache, said that "boiling water started coming out of the crater, and particles of rock and cinders were found nearby", as "fetid, noxious" gases spewed from the crater. Surface impact occurred above .

After the impact, villagers who had approached the impact site grew sick from a then-unexplained illness, with a wide array of symptoms. Two days later, Peruvian scientists confirmed that there had indeed been a meteorite strike, quieting widespread speculation that it might have been a geophysical rather than a celestial event. At that point, no further information on the cause of the mystery illness was known. The ground water in the local area is known to contain arsenic compounds, and the illness is now believed to have been caused by arsenic poisoning incurred when residents of the area inhaled the vapor of the boiling arsenic-contaminated water.

The impact event 
At 11:40:14 local time (16:40:14 GMT) on 15 September 2007, a chondritic meteorite crashed near the village of Carancas in the Puno Region, Peru, near the Bolivian border and Lake Titicaca (see map box on right). A local official, Marco Limache, said that "boiling water started coming out of the crater, and particles of rock and cinders were found nearby", as "fetid, noxious" gases spewed from the crater. The object moved in a direction toward N030E. A smoke column was formed at the site that lasted several minutes, and gas was seen bubbling up in the water in the crater.

He fell from his bicycle but was not injured. A small building  from the impact site did not suffer much either besides roof damage from flying debris.

Soon after the impact, more than 600 villagers visited the site and some began to fall ill from unexplained causes, including symptoms of dermal injuries, nausea, headaches, diarrhea and vomiting. On 20 September, Peruvian scientists confirmed that there had been a meteorite strike, but no further information on the cause of the illnesses was known. Impact crater specialists have called the impact unusual, and have stated that the meteorite was at least  in diameter before breaking up. 

The ground water in the area is known to contain arsenic compounds, and the illness was believed to have been caused by arsenic poisoning incurred when residents of the area inhaled the vapor of the boiling arsenic-contaminated water. 
However, further investigations have led to the conclusion that the arsenic content in the groundwater did not differ from that of the local drinking supply, and that the illness reported was likely caused by the vaporization of troilite, a sulfur-bearing compound present within the meteorite in large amounts, which would have melted at relatively low temperatures and high pressures created by such an impact.

According to cosmochemist Larry Grossman of the University of Chicago, the aerial lights and explosions reported were consistent with extraterrestrial material.

The loud noise and explosive impact originally led Peruvians to think that Chile had launched a rocket attack.

Nature of the object 

A report from three geologists at Peru's Geophysics Institute was released on Thursday 20 September. Astrophysicist Jose Ishitsuka confirmed that there had been a meteorite strike.

On 20 September, the X-Ray Laboratory at the Faculty of Geological Sciences, Mayor de San Andres University, La Paz, Bolivia, published a report of their analysis of a small sample of material recovered from the impact site. They detected iron, nickel, cobalt, and traces of iridium — elements characteristic of the elemental composition of meteorites. The quantitative proportions of silicon, aluminium, potassium, calcium, magnesium and phosphorus are incompatible with rocks that are normally found at the surface of the Earth.

INGEMMET (Instituto Geológico Minero y Metalúrgico) of Peru released internally a report on the Carancas meteorite fall on September 21. The release of the document to the public was delayed for one week. The researchers found that the fragments from the crater zone had a chondritic texture and the following mineral composition: pyroxene (1) 40%, olivine 20%, feldspar 10%, pyroxene (2) 10%; kamacite 15%, troilite 5%, and traces of chromite and native copper. Kamacite occurs naturally only in meteorites.

The official classification of the Carancas meteorite, accepted by the Meteoritical Society, was done by a team of scientists working at the University of Arizona.  The meteorite is an ordinary chondrite, an H chondrite breccia, containing clasts of petrologic types 4 to 5. The formal classification is H4-5.

The meteoroid had experienced a considerable amount of shock before its ultimate encounter with Earth.

Further data were expected from NASA, along with British and Japanese researchers, who intended on looking into the matter.

Illness complaints 
Afterwards, local townspeople went to see what happened, and 100 to 200 people who got near to the meteorite crater soon reported feeling sick. First responding police officers arriving to investigate the scene also fell ill. After the initial event of September 15, the number of people falling ill increased, requiring physicians to establish auxiliary medical tents for the Carancas health center. Patients were treated for dermal injuries, nausea, headaches, diarrhea and vomiting. The death of nearby livestock was also reported. Locals made the decision to stop drinking from nearby water sources for fear of contamination and authorities considered declaring a state of emergency. Four days after the meteorite impact and the unexplained illness, most villagers reported having recovered.

Reported details about the event, such as water boiling in the muddy crater for ten minutes from the heat of the impact, presented a problem for experts. Most larger meteorites are cold in their bulk mass when they land on Earth, since their heated outer layers ablate from the objects before impacting. It was later confirmed that the meteorite contained a large amount of iron and possessed magnetic properties common to similar metallic objects, which contributed to its capacity to retain heat during atmospheric entry.

Government response 
In contrast with other international media reports, Peruvian health officials downplayed the incident. Jorge López Tejada, the Regional Health Director for Puno, Peru, denied any serious medical situation existed. However, a health brigade arrived with personnel and medication to the site on 18 September, reporting that the odors rising from the crater were causing medical issues. Earlier, Tejada had stated that the officers were dizzy, nauseous and some were vomiting.

On 19 September,  Andina, Peru's official government news agency, reported that the sick villagers appeared to be recovering. "They are recovering, there aren't any critical cases. A total of 200 people with different symptoms have been seen," stated López Tejada. Government officials also specifically asked people to avoid the "glowing object that fell from the sky."

The mayor, Maximiliano Trujillo, assumed a psychosomatic reason behind the reports but decided to ask a local shaman to prepare a cleaning ritual in order to calm the population.

Suspected cause 
Scientists initially ruled out radiation as the cause of the illness. Renan Ramirez of the Peruvian Nuclear Energy Institute stated that the medical conditions could have been caused by sulfur, arsenic or other toxins that may have melted in the extreme heat produced by the meteorite strike. Some unnamed Peruvian sources stated soon after the event occurred that it was indeed a meteorite. Later on 18 September, a Peruvian vulcanologist stated that the impact was caused by a chondrite meteorite arrival.

Some reports indicated initial suspicions that the illnesses might have been psychosomatic in nature. Don Yeomans, head of the Near Earth Object Program at NASA's Jet Propulsion Laboratory in Pasadena, California, said, "Statistically, it's far more likely to have come from below than from above. The noxious fumes that have supposedly sickened curious locals who went to examine the crater would seem to indicate hydrothermal activity, such as a local gas explosion, because meteorites don't give off odors."

By 21 September, it was believed that the illness had been caused by arsenic poisoning. Luisa Macedo of Peru's Mining, Metallurgy, and Geology Institute said gases were created when the meteorite's hot surface reacted with an underground water supply tainted with arsenic. Natural arsenic deposits in ground water are not uncommon in southern Peru. José Ishitsuka of the Peruvian Geophysics Institute said, "If the meteorite arrives incandescent and at a high temperature because of ram pressure, hitting water can create a column of steam." Meteorites, however, often impact the earth at low temperatures, making this an unusual event.

See also 

 List of impact craters in South America
 Culture of Peru
 Impact depth
 Impact event
 Meteoroid
 Campo del Cielo

References

External links 

 Brief account on the impact event and photos of Carancas meteorite fragments
 Brown Scientist Answers How Peruvian Meteorite Made It to Earth

Arsenic
Impact craters of Peru
Holocene impact craters
Modern Earth impact events
Health in Peru
2007 in Peru
2007 in science
September 2007 events in South America